Emperor Yingzong of Ming (29 November 1427 – 23 February 1464), personal name Zhu Qizhen, was the sixth and eighth Emperor of the Ming dynasty. He ascended the throne as the Zhengtong Emperor in 1435, but was forced to abdicate in 1449, in favour of his younger brother the Jingtai Emperor, after being captured by the Northern Yuan dynasty during the Tumu Crisis. In 1457, he deposed the Jingtai Emperor and ruled again as the Tianshun Emperor until his death in 1464.

First reign
Zhu Qizhen was the son of the Xuande Emperor and his second wife Empress Sun. At the beginning of the Zhengtong reign, the Ming dynasty was prosperous and at the height of its power as a result of the Xuande Emperor's able administration. The Zhengtong Emperor's accession at the age of eight made him the first child emperor of the dynasty – hence the Zhengtong Emperor was easily influenced by others, especially the eunuch Wang Zhen. At first, Wang Zhen was kept under control by his father's mother, Grand Empress Dowager Zhang, the unofficial regent, who collaborated closely with three ministers, all with the surname Yang (hence the common name "Three Yangs"), thus the good administration continued. In 1442 though, Empress Zhang died, and the three Yangs also died or retired around that time. The emperor began to completely rely on Wang Zhen for advice and guidance.

Imprisonment by the Mongols
At the age of 21, in 1449, the Zhengtong Emperor, advised by Wang Zhen,  personally directed and lost the Battle of Tumu Fortress against the Mongols under Esen Taishi (d.1455). In one of the most humiliating battles in Chinese history, the Ming army, half million strong, led by Zhengtong, was crushed by Esen's forces, estimated to be 20,000 cavalry. His capture by the enemy force shook the empire to its core, and the ensuing crisis almost caused the dynasty to collapse had it not been for the capable governing of a prominent minister named Yu Qian. Yu Qian was responsible for the Defense of Beijing.

Although the Zhengtong Emperor was a prisoner of the Mongols, he became a good friend to both Tayisung Khan Toghtoa Bukha (1416–1453) and his grand preceptor (taishi) Esen. Meanwhile, to calm the crisis at home, his younger brother Zhu Qiyu was installed as the Jingtai Emperor. This reduced the Zhengtong Emperor's imperial status and he was granted the title of Tàishàng Huángdi (emperor emeritus).

Historians at the time, in an effort to avoid what is an obvious taboo of the country's head of state becoming a prisoner of war, referred to this chapter of Yingzong's life as the "Northern Hunt".

House arrest and second reign
The Zhengtong Emperor was released one year later in 1450, but when he returned to China, he was immediately put under house arrest by his brother for almost seven years. He resided in the southern palace of the Forbidden City, and all outside contacts were severely curtailed by the Jingtai Emperor. His son, who later became the Chenghua Emperor, was stripped of the title of crown prince and replaced by the Jingtai Emperor's own son. This act greatly upset and devastated the former Zhengtong Emperor, but the heir apparent died shortly thereafter. Overcome with grief, the Jingtai Emperor fell ill, and the former Zhengtong Emperor decided to depose his brother by a palace coup. The emperor emeritus was successful in seizing the throne from the Jingtai Emperor when the latter was ill, after which he changed his regnal name to "Tianshun" (lit. "obedience to Heaven") and went on to rule for another seven years. Jingtai Emperor was demoted to the Prince of Cheng and put under house arrest and soon died, probably murdered.

On 6 August 1461, the Tianshun Emperor issued an edict warning his subjects to be loyal to the throne and not to violate the laws. This was a veiled threat aimed at the general Cao Qin (d. 1461), who had become embroiled in a controversy when he had one of his retainers kill a man whom Ming authorities were attempting to interrogate (to find out about Cao's illegal foreign business transactions). On 7 August 1461, Cao Qin and his cohorts of Mongol descent attempted a coup against the Tianshun Emperor. However, during the first hours of the morning of 7 August, prominent Ming generals Wu Jin and Wu Cong, who were alerted of the coup, immediately relayed a warning to the emperor. Although alarmed, the Tianshun Emperor and his court made preparations for a conflict and barred the gates of the palace. During the ensuing onslaught in the capital later that morning, the Minister of Works and the Commander of the Imperial Guard were killed, while the rebels set the gates of the Forbidden City on fire. The eastern and western gates of the imperial city were only saved when pouring rains came and extinguished the fires. The fight lasted for nearly the entire day within the city; during which three of Cao Qin's brothers were killed, and Cao himself received wounds to both arms. With the failure of the coup, in order to escape being executed, Cao fled to his residence and committed suicide by jumping down a well within the walled compound of his home.

The Tianshun Emperor died at the age of 36 in 1464 and was buried in the Yuling Mausoleum of the Ming tombs. Before he died, he had given an order, which was rated highly as an act of imperial magnanimity, that ended the practice of burying alive concubines and palace maids (so that they could follow emperors to the next world).

Family

Consorts and Issue:
 Empress Xiaozhuangrui, of the Qian clan (1426–1468)
 Empress Xiaosu, of the Zhou clan (1430–1504)
 Princess Chongqing (1446–1499), first daughter
 Married Zhou Jing in 1461, and had issue (one son)
 Zhu Jianshen, the Chenghua Emperor (9 December 1447 – 9 September 1487), first son
 Zhu Jianze, Prince Jian of Chong (2 May 1455 – 27 August 1505), sixth son
 Consort Jingzhuanganmuchen, of the Wan clan (1432–1468)
 Zhu Jianlin, Prince Zhuang of De (7 May 1448 – 7 September 1517), second son
 Zhu Jianshi (2 August 1449 – 30 August 1451), third son
 Princess Chun'an (1453-1536), third daughter
 Married Cai Zhen in 1466, and had issue (four sons, two daughters)
 Princess Guangde (1454–1484), personal name Yanxiang, fifth daughter
 Married Fan Kai (d. 1513) in 1472, and had issue (four sons, two daughters)
 Zhu Jianjun, Prince Jian of Ji (11 July 1456 – 16 August 1527), seventh son
 Zhu Jianzhi, Prince Mu of Xin (18 March 1458 – 2 April 1472), eighth son
 Consort Duanjinganhehui, of the Wang clan (1429–1485)
 Princess Jiashan (d. 1499), second daughter
 Married Wang Zeng in 1466, and had issue (two daughters)
 Zhu Jianchun, Prince Dao of Xu (6 April 1450 – 3 January 1453), fourth son
 Consort Zhuangxiduansu'an, of the Yang clan (18 July 1414 – 2 November 1487)
 Princess Chongde (d. 1489), fourth daughter
 Married Yang Wei in 1466, and had issue (one son)
 Consort Zhuangjinganrongshu, of the Gao clan (1429–1511)
 Zhu Jianshu, Prince Huai of Xiu (12 March 1452 – 13 October 1472), fifth son
 Princess Longqing (6 November 1455 – 18 December 1480), seventh daughter
 Married You Tai (1458–1533) in 1473, and had issue (one daughter)
 Consort Gongduanzhuanghuide, of the Wei clan (1426–1469)
 Princess Yixing (d. 1514), sixth daughter
 Married Ma Cheng in 1473
 Ninth daughter
 Zhu Jianpei, Prince Zhuang of Hui (2 March 1462 – 13 June 1505), ninth son
 Consort Gongheanjingshun, of the Fan clan (1414–1470)
 Tenth daughter
 Consort Anherongjingli, of the Liu clan (1426–1512)
 Consort Zhaosujingduanxian, of the Wang clan (1430–1474)
 Consort Duanzhuangzhao, of the Wu clan (1431–1467)
 Consort Gong'anhe, of the Gong clan (1430–1467)
 Consort Rongjingzhen, of the Wang clan (1427–1507)
 Consort Gongjingzhuang, of the Zhao clan (1446–1514)
 Consort Zhenshunyigongjing, of the Liu clan (d. 1463)
 Consort Zhaojinggong, of the Liu clan (d. 1500)
 Consort Zhaoyixian, of the Li clan
 Consort Gongxicheng, of the Zhang clan (d. 1504)
 Consort Xikechong, of the Yu clan (d. 1503)
 Consort Huiheli, of the Chen clan (d. 1500)
 Unknown
 Princess Jiaxiang (d. 1483), eight daughter
 Married Huang Yong (d. 1510) in 1477

Ancestry

Popular culture
 Portrayed by Kwon Bin in the 2016 KBS1 TV series Jang Yeong-sil. 
 In the computer game Europa Universalis IV he is the emperor of the playable Ming dynasty at the game's start date of 1444.
Portrayed by Wallace Huo in 2016 television series The Imperial Doctress
 Portrayed by Zhang Yixing in the 2019 television series《大明风华) Ming Dynasty

See also
 Chinese emperors family tree (late)
Tumu Crisis
Rebellion of Cao Qin
Ming dynasty

References

Robinson, David M. "Politics, Force and Ethnicity in Ming China: Mongols and the Abortive Coup of 1461," Harvard Journal of Asiatic Studies  (Volume 59: Number 1, June 1999): 79–123.

|-

|-

|-

|-

1427 births
1464 deaths
15th-century Chinese monarchs
Child monarchs from Asia
Ming dynasty emperors
Monarchs taken prisoner in wartime
Heads of government who were later imprisoned
Ming dynasty Buddhists